The following television stations operate on virtual channel 8 in Mexico:
XHBZC-TDT in La Paz, Baja California Sur
XHTX-TDT in Tuxtla Gutiérrez, Chiapas
XHJCI-TDT in Ciudad Juárez, Chihuahua
XHFAMX-TDT in Mexico City
XHRCG-TDT in Saltillo, Coahuila
XHUNES-TDT in Durango, Durango
XHGSM-TDT in San Miguel de Allende, Guanajuato
XEDK-TDT in Guadalajara, Jalisco
XHCNL-TDT in Monterrey, Nuevo León
XHOXO-TDT (Nu9ve subchannel) in Oaxaca, Oaxaca
XHCCU-TDT in Cancún, Quintana Roo
XHVSL-TDT in Ciudad Valles, San Luis Potosí
XHSLT-TDT (Nu9ve subchannel) in San Luis Potosí, San Luis Potosí
XHUS-TDT in Hermosillo, Sonora
XHNSS-TDT in Nogales, Sonora
XHLL-TDT in Villahermosa, Tabasco
XHAB-TDT in Matamoros, Tamaulipas
XHAI-TDT in Veracruz, Veracruz
XHY-TDT in Mérida, Yucatán

08 virtual